The sabrefin killifish (Campellolebias brucei), also known as the Santa Catarina sabrefin or Turner's gaucho, is a species of killifish in the family Rivulidae. It is endemic to Brazil. This species was described in 1974 with the type locality being a temporary pool between Criciuma and Tubarão in Santa Catarina state. The specific name honours the American ichthyologist, geneticist and ecologist Bruce J. Turner.

References

Rivulidae
Fish of Brazil
Endemic fauna of Brazil
Fish described in 1974
Taxonomy articles created by Polbot